Chilfrome is a small village and civil parish in the county of Dorset in southwest England. The parish church was largely restored in 1864, though it has a thirteenth-century chancel-arch, a partly fourteenth-century nave, and windows dating from the fifteenth century. The church is a Grade II* Listed Building. Dorset County Council estimate that in 2013 the population of the civil parish was 40.

Three long-distance footpaths, the Wessex Ridgeway, the Macmillan Way and the Frome Valley Trail, all pass through the village.

References

Hamlets in Dorset